Shadrack Moeletsi Mogotsi (born 12 December 1962) is a South African middle-distance runner. He competed in the men's 3000 metres steeplechase at the 1996 Summer Olympics.

References

1962 births
Living people
Athletes (track and field) at the 1996 Summer Olympics
South African male middle-distance runners
South African male steeplechase runners
Olympic athletes of South Africa
Place of birth missing (living people)